Korey Toomer (born December 9, 1988) is a former American football linebacker. He was drafted by the Seattle Seahawks in the fifth round of the 2012 NFL Draft. He played college football at Idaho.

Early years
Born and raised in Las Vegas, Nevada, Toomer is the son of Pamelisa and Kyle Toomer. He is a 2007 graduate of Shadow Ridge High School.

College career
A junior college transfer from Arizona Western in Yuma, Toomer played his final two years of college football at Idaho in the WAC. He saw action on special teams and as a reserve linebacker as a junior in 2009 and redshirted in 2010, after seriously injuring his hand in fall camp. As a senior in 2011, Toomer started at linebacker and also saw late season action on offense as a fullback.  After the season he was named the team's MVP.

Professional career

Seattle Seahawks
Toomer was among the Seahawks' last cuts due to shoulder injury in 2012 and was signed to the practice squad. On August 27, 2013, he was placed on the reserve/non-football injury list. He was a part of the 2013 Seattle Seahawks team that won Super Bowl XLVIII. In 2014, he was released as part of final roster cuts.

Dallas Cowboys
Toomer was claimed off waivers by the Cowboys. He was released on October 17, 2014.

St. Louis Rams
Toomer was signed to the Rams' practice squad. On October 28, 2014, he was promoted to the active roster. He was released on August 31, 2015.

Oakland Raiders
Toomer was signed to the Raiders' practice squad on October 27, 2015, and was promoted to the active roster on October 31. On September 3, 2016, Toomer was released by the Raiders. The next day, he was signed to the Raiders' practice squad. He terminated his contract on September 27, 2016.

San Diego / Los Angeles Chargers
On September 28, 2016, Toomer was signed by the Chargers.

On March 9, 2017, the Chargers placed an original-round (fifth round) tender on Toomer. He officially signed his tender on April 4, 2017, keeping him under contract with the Chargers for 2017.

On September 11, 2017, in the season opener against the Denver Broncos on Monday Night Football, Toomer forced a fumble from running back Jamaal Charles. The fumble was recovered by teammate Casey Hayward and set up the Chargers to have an eventual touchdown scoring drive.

San Francisco 49ers
On April 4, 2018, Toomer signed a one-year contract with the San Francisco 49ers. He was released on September 1, 2018.

Green Bay Packers
On September 3, 2018, Toomer signed with the Green Bay Packers. He was released on November 28, 2018.

BC Lions
Toomer signed with the BC Lions of the Canadian Football League on June 25, 2019. He was released after the season on November 15, 2019.

Seattle Dragons
Toomer signed with the Tampa Bay Vipers of the XFL. He was placed on a reserve list before the start of the regular season, and was traded to the Seattle Dragons in exchange for S. J. Green on February 18, 2020. He had his contract terminated when the league suspended operations on April 10, 2020.

References

External links
NFL.com 2012 Draft, Korey Toomer
Go Vandals.com Korey Toomer

1988 births
American football linebackers
Idaho Vandals football players
Living people
Players of American football from Nevada
Sportspeople from Las Vegas
Arizona Western Matadors football players
Seattle Seahawks players
Dallas Cowboys players
St. Louis Rams players
Oakland Raiders players
San Diego Chargers players
Los Angeles Chargers players
San Francisco 49ers players
Green Bay Packers players
BC Lions players
Tampa Bay Vipers players
Seattle Dragons players